Muszkowo  is a village in the administrative district of Gmina Krzeszyce, within Sulęcin County, Lubusz Voivodeship, in western Poland.

The village has a population of 260.

References

Muszkowo